Evan Weaver (born August 11, 1998) is an American football linebacker who is a free agent. He played college football at California and was drafted by the Cardinals in the sixth round of the 2020 NFL Draft.

Early life and high school
Weaver was born and raised in Spokane, Washington and attended Gonzaga Preparatory School, where he played baseball and football. He attended grade school at Cataldo Catholic School, located in South Spokane. He was named first-team All-State and the Inland Northwest Defensive MVP after making 123 tackles, 36 for a loss, with 14 sacks and six forced fumbles. Rated a three-star prospect by most recruiting services, Weaver committed to play college football at California over offers from Arizona, Boise State, Oregon, Utah, Washington and Washington State. As a senior, Weaver was named the State Defensive Player of the Year after recording 125 tackles, 1 int, 5 forced fumbles, 37 tackles for loss, 24 sacks, and two safeties. He finished his high school career with 393 tackles, 78.0 tackles for loss, 45.0 sacks, and 14 forced fumbles. Weaver also played as a running back his senior year in the 2015 season, and scored the third and fourth touchdown for Gonzaga Prep in the WIAA 2015 Championship against Skyline, where he rushed for a net gain of 133 yards, with his longest run being 24 yards.
 Although he played baseball in high school, he opted out his senior year once he made his college commitment.

College career
Weaver played in 11 games as a true freshman as a reserve defensive end, making 16 tackles with 1.5 sacks. Weaver moved from defensive end to outside linebacker during spring camp and then moved to inside linebacker going into his sophomore year. He became a starter midway through the season and finished with 55 tackles, two for loss, and two passes broken up.

As a junior, Weaver started all 13 of the Golden Bears games and led the FBS with 159 tackles (9.5 for loss) with 4.5 sacks, two interceptions, and six passes broken up. He was named the Pac-12 Conference player of the week on October 29, 2018 for an 11-tackle (one for loss) performance with a pass broken up and an interception return for a touchdown in Cal's 12-10 upset of #15 Washington. Weaver was named a second-team All-American by Pro Football Focus, first-team All-Pac-12 by the Associated Press and second-team All-Pac-12 by the league's coaches.

Weaver entered his senior season on the watchlists for the Butkus Award and the Bronko Nagurski Trophy. He was named a midseason All-American by the Associated Press and CBS Sports. At the end of the season, Weaver was named the Pac-12 Defensive Player of the Year and earned first-team All-Pac-12 honors after leading the nation with a school-record and Pac-12-record 182 tackles. He also became the first Cal player to earn consensus first-team All-American honors since Daymeion Hughes and DeSean Jackson in 2006.

Professional career

Weaver was drafted by the Arizona Cardinals in the sixth round with the 202nd overall pick of the 2020 NFL Draft. He was waived on September 5, 2020. He was re-signed to the practice squad a day later. He signed a reserve/future contract on January 5, 2021. He was waived on August 30, 2021.

References

External links
California Golden Bears bio

1998 births
Living people
American football linebackers
California Golden Bears football players
Players of American football from Spokane, Washington
All-American college football players
Arizona Cardinals players